Surichata (Aymara and Quechua suri rhea, Pukina chata mountain, Hispanicized spelling Zorrichata) is a  mountain in the Andes of southern Peru, about  high. It is situated in the Puno Region, Puno Province, on the border of the districts San Antonio and Pichacani. Surichata lies north of the mountain Kunturiri and northeast of Wankarani and  Ninachiri.

References

Mountains of Puno Region
Mountains of Peru